On April 8, 1994, Kurt Cobain, the lead singer and guitarist of the American rock band Nirvana, was found dead at his home in Seattle, Washington. Forensics investigators later determined he had died three days earlier, on April 5. The Seattle Police Department incident report stated that Cobain was found with a shotgun across his body, had suffered a visible gunshot wound to the head, and that a suicide note had been discovered nearby. The Seattle Police ruled Cobain's death as a suicide. Following his death, conspiracy theories that Cobain was murdered were spread.

Background 

Kurt Cobain was the lead singer and guitarist of the American grunge rock band Nirvana, one of the most influential acts of the 1990s and one of the best-selling bands of all time. Throughout most of his life, Cobain suffered from chronic bronchitis and intense pain due to an undiagnosed chronic stomach condition. He was also prone to alcoholism, suffered from depression, and regularly used drugs and inhalants. Cobain had two uncles who killed themselves using guns.

On March 3, 1994, Cobain was hospitalized in Rome following an overdose of painkillers. His management agency, Gold Mountain Records, said that the overdose was accidental, and that he was suffering from influenza and fatigue. However, Cobain's wife, Courtney Love, later said the overdose had been a suicide attempt: "He took 50 pills. He probably forgot how many he took. But there was a definite suicidal urge, to be gobbling and gobbling and gobbling." Cobain's cousin Beverly, a nurse, said that the family had a history of suicide, and that Cobain had been diagnosed with attention-deficit hyperactivity disorder and bipolar disorder.

Cobain said that his stomach pain had been so severe during Nirvana's 1991 European tour that he became suicidal, and that taking heroin was "the only thing that's saving me from shooting myself right now". In Charles Cross's biography Heavier Than Heaven, Nirvana bassist Krist Novoselic is quoted on seeing Cobain in the days before his intervention: "He was really quiet. He was just estranged from all of his relationships. He wasn't connecting with anybody." Novoselic's offer to buy dinner for Cobain resulted in unintentionally driving him to score heroin: "His dealer was right there. He wanted to get fucked up into oblivion ... He wanted to die, that's what he wanted to do."

Death 
On March 31, 1994, Cobain left the rehabilitation center he had checked into the day before,  Exodus Recovery Center, by scaling a six-foot wall. On April 2, Cobain took a taxi to a Seattle gun shop, where he purchased and received a receipt for shotgun shells. Cobain told the taxi driver he wanted to buy shells because he had been burglarized.

On April 8, Cobain's body was discovered in the greenhouse above the garage at his Lake Washington Boulevard East house by VECA Electric employee Gary T. Smith, who arrived that morning to install security lighting. Smith initially thought Cobain was asleep until he saw blood coming out of Cobain's ear. He also found a suicide note with a pen stuck through it inside a flower pot. A Remington Model 11 20-gauge shotgun purchased for Cobain by his friend, musician Dylan Carlson, was found on Cobain's chest. It had been legally purchased by Carlson at Stan Baker's Gun Shop in Seattle. Although conductor David Woodard had built a Dreamachine for Cobain, rumors that Cobain had been using the device heavily in the days leading up to his suicide were contradicted by later reports.

Cobain did not want the gun purchased in his name because he thought the police might seize it for his own protection. The police had taken away his guns twice in the previous ten months. The King County Medical Examiner noted puncture wounds on the inside of both the right and left elbows. The shotgun was not checked for fingerprints until May 6, 1994. According to the Fingerprint Analysis Report, four latent prints were lifted, but they were not usable. The Seattle police report states that the shotgun was inverted on Cobain's chest with his left hand wrapped around the barrel.

On April 14, the Seattle Post-Intelligencer reported that Cobain was "high on heroin when he pulled the trigger". The paper reported that the toxicological tests determined that the level of morphine in Cobain's bloodstream was 1.52 milligrams per liter and that there was evidence of Valium in his blood. The report contained a quote from Randall Baselt of the Chemical Toxicological Institute and author of all 12 editions of the common forensic toxicology textbook *Disposition of Toxic Drugs
and Chemicals in Man* (including its chapter on heroin) stated that Cobain's heroin level was at "a high concentration, by any account" but that the strength of the dose would depend on many factors, including how habituated Cobain was to the drug.

In March 2014, the Seattle Police Department (SPD) developed four rolls of film that had been left in an evidence vault. According to Seattle police, the photographs depict the scene of Cobain's corpse more clearly than previous Polaroid images taken by the police. Detective Mike Ciesynski, a cold case investigator, was asked to look at the film because "it is 20 years later and it's a high media case". Ciesynski stated that the official cause of Cobain's death remained suicide and that the images would not be released to the public; however the images were released in 2016. According to a police spokesperson, the SPD receives at least one request weekly, mostly through Twitter, to reopen the investigation. This resulted in the maintenance of the basic incident report on file.

Memorial and cremation 
On April 10, 1994, a public memorial service was held at Seattle Center, where a recording of Courtney Love reading Cobain's suicide note was played. Near the end of the vigil, Love arrived, and distributed some of his clothing to fans who remained. In the following days, Love consoled and mourned with fans who came to her house.

Cobain's body was cremated. Love divided his ashes; she kept some in a teddy bear and some in an urn. She took another portion of his ashes to the Namgyal Buddhist Monastery in Ithaca, New York. There, some of his remains were ceremonially blessed by Buddhist monks and mixed into clay, which were used to make memorial sculptures. A final ceremony was arranged for Cobain by his mother on May 31, 1999, that was attended by both Love and Tracy Marander. A Buddhist monk chanted while Cobain's daughter, Frances Bean Cobain, scattered his ashes into McLane Creek in Olympia, Washington, the city where he "had found his true artistic muse".

Reactions from Cobain's friends 
Several of Cobain's friends were surprised by his suicide. Mark Lanegan, a long-time friend of Cobain, told Rolling Stone: "I never knew Cobain to be suicidal. I just knew he was going through a tough time." In the same article, Carlson stated that he wished Cobain or someone close to him had told him that the Rome incident was a suicide attempt. Danny Goldberg, founder of Gold Mountain Records, refers in his book Dispatches From the Culture Wars: How the Left Lost Teen Spirit to "the crazy Internet rumors that Kurt Cobain had not committed suicide but had been murdered," stating that Cobain's suicide "haunts him every day".

Anthony Kiedis, lead singer of the Red Hot Chili Peppers, expressed his feelings in his autobiography, Scar Tissue, writing: The news [of Cobain's death] sucked the air out of the entire house, I didn't feel like I felt when Hillel died; it was more like "The world just suffered a great loss." Kurt's death was unexpected ... It was an emotional blow, and we all felt it. I don't know why everyone on earth felt so close to that guy; he was beloved and endearing and inoffensive in some weird way. For all of his screaming and all of his darkness, he was just lovable.

The song "Tearjerker" from the band's One Hot Minute album was written about Cobain.

A musical hero of Cobain's, Greg Sage, said in an interview: Well, I can't really speculate other than what he said to me, which was, he wasn't at all happy about it, success to him seemed like, I think, a brick wall. There was nowhere else to go but down, it was too artificial for him, and he wasn't an artificial person at all. He was actually, two weeks after he died, he was supposed to come here and he wanted to record a bunch of Leadbelly covers. It was kind of in secret, because, I mean, people would definitely not allow him to do that. You also have to wonder, he was a billion-dollar industry at the time, and if the industry had any idea at all of him wishing or wanting to get out, they couldn't have allowed that, you know, in life, because if he was just to get out of the scene, he'd be totally forgotten, but if he was to die, he'd be immortalized.

Toxicological ambiguities 
Some controversy arose after Cobain's death regarding whether his 1.52 mg/L blood morphine level indicates irrefutable evidence of a fatal overdose. The ambiguity on this subject has been contributed to by a lack of clarification whether the 1.52 mg/L figure from Cobain's toxicology report represents a "total morphine" assay (which includes a variety of long-lived morphine metabolites that can increase in the bloodstream as a result of a series of typical heroin doses throughout an extended time period) or a "free morphine" assay (a more specialized test that counts the only those morphine molecules that have not yet been broken down by the body into protein-bound morphine metabolites).

The distinction between a free morphine count and a total morphine count is important in determining a survivable dose. A 2002 study in Forensic Science International by Meissner et al. "to distinguish fatal from non-fatal blood concentrations of morphine" showed that a total morphine count of 1.52 mg/L can be survivable, while a free morphine count above 0.12 mg/L is fatal. This study observed a highest non-fatal total blood morphine count of 2.11 mg/L in drivers who also tested positive for other drugs, indicating that being conscious enough to attempt driving a car is possible in extreme cases for subjects with a total morphine count significantly higher than 1.52 mg/L (the figure from Cobain's study). 

The same study also reported that the highest free morphine count from a heroin overdose survivor was 0.128 mg/L, and lists an extreme case where a subject died with a free morphine count of 2.8 mg/L (21.8 times higher than a lethal dose) and a total morphine count of 5.0 mg/L. Based on this a 1.52 mg/L free morphine count would be 11.875 times higher than a lethal dose.

However it remains unknown whether Cobain's 1.52 mg/L figure represents a free or total morphine count. The technology and know-how to perform both free and total morphine assays has existed since the 1970s. Total morphine assays are cheaper, easier, and more commonly performed, especially in hospitals where the pharmacologically active metabolites of morphine provide most of its longer-lasting analgesic effects, and in law enforcement, since the full picture of morphine and all its metabolites provided by a total morphine assay provides a better indicator of intoxication and impairment than a free morphine assay. Meanwhile, free morphine assays are less common because they require more specialized equipment, methods, and expertise to perform, making them limited in use outside the context of research studies, and free morphine assays must be performed relatively soon post-mortem in order to be accurate. Additionally, most research published on the use of free morphine assays for cause-of-death in heroin cases has been published after 2000.

While it remains unconfirmed whether Cobain's toxicology figure of 1.52 mg/L was the result of a free morphine assay or total morphine assay, Randall Baselt's opinion given in the Seattle Post Intelligencer is consistent with an interpretation of the 1.52 mg/L figure being a total morphine count, and Baselt is considered a world expert in toxicology. Baselt's 1975 paper on heroin deaths in San Francisco relied on total morphine counts, and found that "morphine blood levels per se are meaningless in attempting to assign a cause of death in a Medical Examiner's case, since morphine levels found in narcotics users dying of causes other than overdose averaged slightly higher than those of the overdose victims. However, a positive finding for morphine in blood is certainly a further indication of narcotics use and is probably indicative of usage within the four hours before death."

Conspiracy theories

Richard Lee 
The first to object publicly to the report of suicide was Seattle public access host Richard Lee. A week following Cobain's death, Lee aired the first episode of an ongoing series called Kurt Cobain Was Murdered, saying there were several discrepancies in the police reports, including several changes in the nature of the shotgun blast. Lee acquired a video that was taped on April 8 from the tree outside Cobain's garage, showing the scene around Cobain's body, which he claimed showed a marked absence of blood for what was reported as a point-blank shotgun blast to the head. Several pathology experts have stated that a shotgun blast inside the mouth often results in less blood, unlike a shotgun blast to the head.

Tom Grant 
Tom Grant, a private investigator hired by Love to find Cobain after his departure from drug rehabilitation, said he believes that Cobain was murdered. Grant's theory has been analyzed and questioned by several books, television shows, and films, including the 2015 docudrama Soaked in Bleach. Grant was still under Love's employment when Cobain's body was found. Grant has stated that he finds the events surrounding Cobain's death to be "filled with lies, contradictions in logic, and countless inconsistencies. Motivated by profit over truth as well as a web of business deals and personal career considerations, Courtney Love, her lawyers, and many of Courtney's industry supporters have engaged in an effort to keep the public from learning the real facts of this case." 

There are several components to Grant's theory. One component is Grant's assertion that Cobain could not have injected himself with such a large dose of heroin and still have been able to pull the trigger. Grant says he based this belief on his lack of knowing about any studies or evidence to indicate that such a high dose could be survived, although he doesn't rule out whether a counterexample might exist (for updated information on the question of how to interpret Cobain's blood morphine count, see Toxicological ambiguities). Another component is Grant's belief that Cobain's note was doctored to make it only appear to be a suicide note. A third component is the purported lack of fingerprints from Cobain or others at the scene. He also asserts that Love had financial motivation to kill Cobain, both in the form of rumors that Cobain was planning to divorce her, and the fact that Cobain had turned down an offer to headline the 1994 Lollapalooza festival for nearly $10 million.

In studying the Rome incident, journalists Ian Halperin and Max Wallace contacted Dr. Osvaldo Galletta, who treated Cobain after the incident. Galletta contested the claim that the Rome overdose was a suicide attempt. "We can usually tell a suicide attempt. This didn't look like one to me," said Galletta, who also contradicted Love's claim that 50 Rohypnol pills were removed from Cobain's stomach. Halperin and Wallace mused, "Grant believes Courtney may have mixed a large number of pills into Kurt's champagne so that when he took a drink, he was actually unknowingly ingesting large amounts of the drug, enough to kill him. But if that's the case, why did she call the police when she found him unconscious on the floor? If she wanted Kurt dead, why didn't she just leave him on the floor until he died?"

Grant believes the claim that the Rome incident was a suicide attempt was not made until after Cobain's death. Prior to the shooting, some close to Cobain, notably Gold Mountain Records, firmly denied he had wanted to die. Grant believes that if that were true, Cobain's friends and family would have been told in order that they could keep a close watch on him. However, others assert that these denials were simply self-serving, in an effort to mask what was really going on behind the scenes. Lee Ranaldo, guitarist for Sonic Youth, told Rolling Stone, "Rome was only the latest installment of [those around Cobain] keeping a semblance of normalcy for the outside world."

Grant counters the claim that he profits from the sale of casebook kits on his website by stating that it offsets some of the costs of his investigation. Grant stated: "I wrestled with that ... but if I go broke, I'll have to give up my pursuit and Courtney wins." Sergeant Donald Cameron, one of the homicide detectives involved in the case, dismissed Grant's theory outright, saying, "[Grant] hasn't shown us a shred of proof that this was anything other than suicide," while Seattle homicide detective Mike Ciesynski, who reviewed the case, was quoted as saying of Grant, "An experienced Det. would never have come up with the theories that he's come up with." Grant in turn has accused Cameron of being a personal friend of Courtney Love. Dylan Carlson told Halperin and Wallace that he also did not believe that Grant's theory was valid, and in an interview with Broomfield implied that if he believed that his friend was murdered, he would have dealt with it himself.

Nick Broomfield 
Filmmaker Nick Broomfield, deciding to investigate the theories himself, brought a film crew to visit a number of people associated with both Cobain and Love, including Love's estranged father, Cobain's aunt, and one of the couples' former nannies. Broomfield also spoke to the Mentors' bandleader Eldon "El Duce" Hoke, who claimed that Love had offered him $50,000 to kill Cobain. Although Hoke claimed that he knew who killed Cobain, he did not mention a name and offered no evidence to support his assertion. However, he mentioned speaking to someone called "Allen" or "Alain", before quickly interjecting, "I mean, my friend", then laughing, "I'll let the FBI catch him." According to Mentors' bass player Steve Broy, the whole story was concocted to sell supermarket tabloids. Broomfield incidentally captured Hoke's final interview, as he died days later when he was struck by a train in the middle of the night.

Broomfield titled the finished documentary Kurt & Courtney, which was released on February 27, 1998. In the end, Broomfield felt he hadn't uncovered enough evidence to conclude the existence of a conspiracy. In a 1998 interview, he summed up his thoughts: "I think that he committed suicide. I don't think that there's a smoking gun. And I think there's only one way you can explain a lot of things around his death. Not that he was murdered, but that there was just a lack of caring for him. I just think that Courtney had moved on, and he was expendable."

Ian Halperin and Max Wallace 
Journalists Ian Halperin and Max Wallace followed a similar path and attempted to investigate the murder theory themselves. Based on evidence gathered in interviews, Halperin and Wallace believed that Cobain wanted to divorce Love near the time of his death, and that she was looking for "a vicious divorce lawyer" to help crush a prenuptial agreement she had reportedly signed that would keep their respective fortunes separate in the event of divorce. They also made the case that because Nikolas Hartshorne (the coroner in Cobain's case) was an admitted friend of Love's, that this was a conflict of interest. Their initial book, Who Killed Kurt Cobain?, was released in 1999, and drew a similar conclusion to Broomfield's film: while there wasn't enough evidence to conclusively prove foul play, there was more than enough to demand that the case be reopened. A notable element of the book included their discussions with Grant, who had taped nearly every conversation he had undertaken while he was working for Love. Over the next several years, Halperin and Wallace collaborated with Grant to write a second book, 2004's Love and Death: The Murder of Kurt Cobain.

Friends and family 
The overall consensus amongst his close friends and family is that Cobain committed suicide. However some of Cobain's friends and family members also believe Cobain was murdered.  Hank Harrison, Courtney Love's father, has shared his belief that Love had a motive, there is evidence of foul play, and the case should be re-opened. Cobain's grandfather, Leland Cobain, also publicly stated that he believed Cobain was murdered.

In August 2005, Sonic Youth's Kim Gordon was asked about Cobain's death in an interview for Uncut Magazine. When asked what she thought to be Cobain's motive for suicide, Gordon replied: "I don't even know that he killed himself. There are people close to him who don't think that he did ..." When asked if she thought someone else had killed him, Gordon answered, "I do, yes." In the same interview, Gordon's then-husband and collaborator Thurston Moore stated: Kurt died in a very harsh way. It wasn't just an OD. He actually killed himself violently. It was so aggressive, and he wasn't an aggressive person, he was a smart person, he had an interesting intellect. So it kind of made sense because it was like: wow, what a fucking gesture. But at the same time it was like: something's wrong with that gesture. It doesn't really lie with what we know.
However, in 2015, in a piece she wrote for The Guardian, Gordon said that she had not been surprised to hear of Cobain's suicide, stating, "I'll always remember the day Thurston called to tell me Kurt had shot himself. Of course I was totally shocked, but I wasn’t entirely surprised. There had been an incident in Rome, where Kurt had OD'd, but the details were never clear."

Others, however, have dismissed or ignored the conspiracy theories surrounding Cobain's death. In an interview with The Independent, former Nirvana manager and friend of Cobain, Danny Goldberg, emphasized Cobain's erratic and depressed behavior in the days and weeks leading up to his death, stating, It’s ridiculous. He killed himself. I saw him the week beforehand, he was depressed. He tried to kill himself six weeks earlier, he’d talked and written about suicide a lot, he was on drugs, he got a gun. Why do people speculate about it? The tragedy of the loss is so great people look for other explanations. I don’t think there’s any truth at all to it. Krist Novoselic shared his thoughts in a Reddit AMA:

In the April 19, 2004 issue of People magazine, some of his family shared a statement about his death:

References

Further reading 
 Maxim Furek (2008). The Death Proclamation of Generation X: A Self-Fulfilling Prophecy of Goth, Grunge and Heroin, "Kurt Donald Cobain", pp. 20–38. i-Universe. 

1994 in music
1994 in American music
1994 in Seattle
April 1994 events in the United States
Cobain, Kurt
Cobain, Kurt
Kurt Cobain
Cobain, Kurt
1994 suicides

es:Kurt Cobain#Semanas finales y muerte